Best Sellers is a 2021 comedy-drama film directed by Lina Roessler and written by Anthony Grieco. It stars Michael Caine, Aubrey Plaza, Scott Speedman, Ellen Wong, Veronica Ferres, and Cary Elwes.

The film was an official selection at the Berlin International Film Festival. It was released in the United States and Canada on September 17, 2021, by Screen Media Films and Mongrel Media, respectively.

Plot
Lucy Stanbridge (Aubrey Plaza) is a young publisher who inherited her father's once successful publishing house. To keep it afloat in face of a recent streak of disastrous releases, she seeks the help of cantankerous old writer Harris Shaw (Michael Caine), a legendary author who hasn't published a book in 50 years. Lucy has a contract that stipulates Shaw still owes the publishing house a book and is required to do a book tour for it. Reluctantly, Harris agrees to gives his unpublished manuscript to Lucy and to go on tour with her, but his wild antics prove to be hard to handle.

Cast
 Michael Caine as Harris Shaw
 Aubrey Plaza as Lucy Stanbridge
 Scott Speedman as Jack Sinclair
 Ellen Wong as Rachel Spence
 Cary Elwes as Halpren Nolan
 Veronica Ferres as Drew Davis

Production
The script was awarded a prestigious Nicholl Fellowship in Screenwriting in 2015.

The project was announced in May 2019 while it was being sold during the Cannes Film Festival. Michael Caine was cast to star, with Lina Roessler set to make her directorial debut. Filming was originally set to begin in July that year. However no additional news was announced until November, when Aubrey Plaza and Scott Speedman were added to the cast. In December, Ellen Wong and Cary Elwes joined the cast of the film.

Filming began in November 2019 in Montreal, Quebec, with filming expected to continue until December 12.

Release
The film was selected but did not have its world premiere at the Berlin International Film Festival in March due to the COVID-19 pandemic. In July 2021, Screen Media Films acquired U.S. distribution rights to the film. It was released in the United States and Canada on September 17, 2021.

Reception

References

External links
 
 Best Sellers at Library and Archives Canada

2021 comedy-drama films
2020s English-language films
American comedy-drama films
Canadian comedy-drama films
English-language Canadian films
Films about writers
Films scored by Paul Leonard-Morgan
Films shot in Montreal
2020s Canadian films
2020s American films